Gerhardodon is an extinct genus of mammal from the Lower Cretaceous of southern England. It was a member of the also extinct order of Multituberculata, and lived with such dinosaurs as Iguanodon. It lies within the suborder "Plagiaulacida" and family Pinheirodontidae.

The genus Gerhardodon ("Gerhard’s tooth") was named by Kielan-Jaworowska Z. and Ensom P.C. in 1992 based on a single species, Gerhardodon purbeckensis. It is known from the Berriasian (Lower Cretaceous) strata of Durlston Bay in Dorset, England. It is a multituberculate mammal from the Isle of Purbeck, Dorset. This formation is sometimes considered to be partly Upper Jurassic.

References
 Kielan-Jaworowska & Ensom (1992), Multituberculate Mammals from the Upper Jurassic Purbeck Limestone Formation of southern England. Paleontology, 35, p. 95-126.
 Kielan-Jaworowska Z & Hurum JH (2001), "Phylogeny and Systematics of multituberculate mammals". Paleontology 44, p. 389-429.
 MESOZOIC MAMMALS

Multituberculates
Early Cretaceous mammals of Europe
Prehistoric mammal genera
Fossil taxa described in 1992